Moulin is a Charleroi Metro station, located on the border of Marchienne-au-Pont and Monceau-sur-Sambre (both part of the Charleroi municipality), in fare zone 2. The station is built on a viaduct and features a central platform with escalator and stairs access at the western end, leading to two separate street accesses (one on each side of the Rue de Mons).

Nearby points of interest 
 Monceau-sur-Sambre castle and park.

Transfers  
TEC Charleroi bus lines 50 and 51.

Charleroi Metro stations
Railway stations opened in 1992